Arenaways was an open-access railway operator in Italy. It began passenger operations between Milan and Turin in November 2010, competing with national monopoly operator Trenitalia. Arenaways was running the first private passenger-carrying rail services since nationalisation, and intended to complain to the competition authority about the dominance of Trenitalia.

The company offered a number of novel on-board services.

References

External links

Railway companies of Italy